The 1994 Prague municipal election was held as part of 1994 Czech municipal elections. It was the first that Prague consisted only one electoral district.

Campaign
ODS was led by Jan Koukal. Koukal became Mayor of Prague in 1993 when he replaced Milan Kondr. Koukal had an image of strong and decisive leader. The campaign focused on his positive personal qualities. Other parties tried to imitate this tactics.

Results

ODS won an overwhelming victory and a formed coalition with the Civic Democratic Alliance.

References

1994
Prague municipal election
Municipal election, 1994